Amor Bach Hamba (born 13 August 1977) is a Tunisian wrestler. He competed in the men's Greco-Roman 85 kg at the 2000 Summer Olympics.

References

1977 births
Living people
Tunisian male sport wrestlers
Olympic wrestlers of Tunisia
Wrestlers at the 2000 Summer Olympics
Place of birth missing (living people)